The Municipal Auditorium is a 7,853-seat multi-purpose arena in New Orleans, Louisiana, and a component of the New Orleans Cultural Center, alongside the Mahalia Jackson Theater of the Performing Arts. It is located in the Tremé neighborhood in Louis Armstrong Park adjacent to Congo Square.

History
The auditorium opened on May 30, 1930. It was designed by Favrot and Livaudais Architects, and constructed by contractor George A. Caldwell. It has hosted many concerts and events, perhaps being best known as the site of many of the New Orleans Mardi Gras krewe balls.

On August 24, 1956, Joe Brown defeated Wallace “Bud” Smith to win the lightweight title in a fifteen-round split decision.

It hosted the New Orleans Buccaneers of the American Basketball Association during the 1969–70 season. It also hosted the New Orleans Jazz basketball team, during its inaugural 1974–1975 season, before the team moved to the Louisiana Superdome. The arena was also home ice to the minor-league hockey franchise, the New Orleans Brass, from 1997 to 1999, before they moved into the New Orleans Arena. It has also hosted LHSAA wrestling and professional wrestling matches.

The venue was a temporary casino before the new Harrah's New Orleans building on Canal Street was opened.

In August 2005 the auditorium suffered damage from Hurricane Katrina and associated flooding (see: Effect of Hurricane Katrina on New Orleans). Future usage of the arena is currently uncertain.

Gallery

See also
List of convention centers in the United States
List of music venues
Theater in Louisiana

References

External links

American Basketball Association venues
Basketball venues in New Orleans
Boxing venues in New Orleans
Convention centers in Louisiana
Defunct boxing venues in the United States
Defunct sports venues in New Orleans
Defunct indoor ice hockey venues in the United States
Former National Basketball Association venues
Indoor arenas in New Orleans
Music venues in Louisiana
New Orleans Brass arenas
New Orleans Buccaneers venues
New Orleans Jazz venues
Sports venues completed in 1930
Theatres in New Orleans
Wrestling venues in New Orleans
1930 establishments in Louisiana